Thane Creek (or Thana Creek) is an inlet in the shoreline of the Arabian Sea that isolates the city of Mumbai (Bombay) from the Konkan region of the Indian mainland. It comprises the area between Mumbra Retibunder and the Mankhurd-Vashi Bridge. The creek is divided into two parts. The first part lies between Ghodbunder and Thane (Thana), a section from where the Ulhas river flows from the north of Mumbai Island to meet the Arabian Sea on the west. The second part of the waterway lies between the city of Thane and the Arabian Sea at Trombay / Uran, before the Gharapuri islands.

Thane Creek was formed due to a seismic fault lying below it which runs from Uran to Thane.

In antiquity, Thane served as the capital of the Sheelahar kingdom, and was a large functional port for trade with the Arabian peninsula, along with other ports, such as Ghodbunder and Nagla Bunder. The region of the Thane Creek has been recognized as an Important Bird Area by the Bombay Natural History Society, as it is home to various avian species. In particular, it harbors populations of flamingos and several other migratory and wading birds. The area has been designated as a protected Ramsar site since 2022.

Thane Creek Flamingo Sanctuary 

The Maharashtra Government has declared the area along the western bank of the Thane Creek as the "Thane Creek Flamingo Sanctuary". It will be Maharashtra's second marine sanctuary after Malvan sanctuary. The sanctuary was notified by Govt. Gazette on 6 August 2015. During the Covid-19 pandemic, worldwide lockdown was seen, as a result the pollution levels were drastically reduced and so as a result in the mid of December 2020, dolphins were spotted here. In 2022, as per an extensive count by the Bombay Natural History Society (BNHS), the number of flamingoes increased to more than 130,000.

The total area of the TCF sanctuary is 1,690 hectares (896 hectares of mangrove forests and 794 hectares of a water body).

Railway bridges

Thane railway bridge or Thane railway viaduct is the oldest rail bridge constructed on this creek. It has two sections, a smaller section built of stones and concrete and a longer section built of stone and concrete but with a steel girder in middle.

A parallel railway bridge lies on the harbour line of Mumbai suburban railway.

A new parallel railway bridge, also with two sections, has been constructed for fast local trains.

The railway bridge is shown on Google Maps as Mankurd Vashi Railway Bridge.

Road bridges 

Thane road bridge is the oldest bridge built over this creek. This bridge connects Thane and Kalwa. The old road bridge is no longer in use and has been superseded by the new parallel bridge.

Vashi & Airoli road bridge connects two sister cities of Mumbai and Navi Mumbai. These bridges are very important bridges as it carries heavy traffic between Mumbai, Navi Mumbai and towards Pune. Being one of the busiest routes in India, the bridge provides a shorter route to Pune. A parallel trans-harbour road link is under construction to connect Mumbai's two ports as well as to reduce rush on this bridge.

References

External links

 http://www.mumbai77.com/city/4075/attractions/thane-creek-mudflats-flamingo-sanctuary/
 http://asc-india.org/seismi/seis-maharashtra.htm
 http://theory.tifr.res.in/bombay/physical/fault.html

Estuaries of Mumbai
Important Bird Areas of India
Geography of Thane district
Ramsar sites in India